Petrelë Castle is a castle in Petrelë, central Albania.

The castle of Petrelë has a rich history, containing a tower which was built in the sixth century AD.

It is one of the tourist locations close to Tirana that attracts a great number of visitors. The Castle, the prominent wooden structure is a restaurant, is perched on a rocky hill, above the village with the same name. It has a triangular shape with two observation towers. Although it was first built in ancient times, the present building dates from the 15th century.

The Petrela Castle was part of the signaling and defense system of Krujë Castle. The castles signaled to each other by means of fires. During Skanderbeg’s fight against the Ottomans, the Petrela Castle used to be under the command of Mamica Kastrioti, Skanderbeg's sister. Today there is a restaurant inside the castle. The castle site has views of the Erzen valley, the hills, olive groves, and surrounding mountains.

Gallery

See also
Tourism in Albania
Architecture of Albania
History of Albania

References

Towers completed in the 6th century
Castles in Albania
Buildings of Justinian I
Buildings and structures in Tirana County
Tourist attractions in Tirana County